John Hungerford Pollen (22 September 1858–1925) was an English Jesuit, known as a historian of the Protestant Reformation.

Life
John Hungerford Pollen was the son of John Hungerford Pollen and Maria Margaret Pollen. The third of ten children, he was born in London in 1858. His father was professor of fine arts at the Catholic University in Dublin. Pollen junior was educated at The Oratory School in Birmingham, and then London University.

Pollen entered the Society of Jesus in 1877 and was ordained in 1891. In 1895 he was assigned the task of creating a history of the Society in England. Pollen became involved in historical research and archives. His research took him through England, France, and Italy. By 1920 he held the title of Keeper of the Archives.

He was one of the group of Jesuit historians restoring the reputation of Robert Persons. He was influential in the history of the term Counter-Reformation, accepting for the Catholic side the appellation for the period of Catholic reform centred on the Council of Trent, but at the same time offering an interpretation that made it less reactive, in relation to the Protestant Reformation. These ideas were put forth in the 1908 Catholic Encyclopedia article he wrote on the subject. Pollen was also a contributor to The Month, and the Dublin Review.

Pollen was vice-postulator for the beatification of the English Martyrs.

He was a correspondent of Georg Cantor, from 1896 and a founding member with Joseph Stanislaus Hansom of the Catholic Record Society  in 1904.

Works
Acts of the English Martyrs (1891)
Life of Father John Morris (1886)
Papal Negotiations with Mary, Queen of Scots (1901)
Unpublished Documents Relating to the English Martyrs (1908)
The Bedingfield Papers (1909)
A Jesuit Challenge: Edmund Campion's Debates at the Tower of London in 1581 (1914; edited with Joseph Rickaby)
The English Catholics in the Reign of Queen Elizabeth (1920)

Notes

External links

New Catholic Dictionary

1858 births
1925 deaths
20th-century English Jesuits
19th-century English Jesuits
British historians of religion
Reformation historians
19th-century British historians
20th-century English historians
English male non-fiction writers
19th-century English writers
19th-century English male writers
Contributors to the Catholic Encyclopedia